The Keystone NK or Keystone Pup was a two-seat biplane trainer built by Keystone Aircraft for the United States Navy.

Design and development
The NK was an open-cockpit two-seat biplane with a convertible wheel or float landing gear. It was powered by a 220 hp (164 kW) Wright R-790 Whirlwind. The company prototype designated the Pup was entered into a United States Navy design competition for a trainer and was awarded a contract for three prototypes designated XNK-1. Following evaluation a production batch of 16 was ordered designated NK-1 which were delivered during 1930.

Variants
Pup
Keystone prototype, one built.
XNK-1
Prototypes for Naval variant of Pup, three built.
NK-1
Production aircraft with minor changes, 16 built.

Operators

United States Navy

Specifications (NK-1)

References

External links

Aerofiles

NK
1920s United States military trainer aircraft
Single-engined tractor aircraft
Biplanes
Floatplanes